Bargny may refer to:

Bargny, Oise, a commune in the Oise department in France
Bargny, Senegal